Alien: Isolation is a 2014 survival horror game developed by Creative Assembly and published by Sega for PlayStation 3, PlayStation 4, Windows, Xbox 360, and Xbox One. Based on the Alien film series, the game is set 15 years after the events of the original 1979 film, and follows engineer Amanda Ripley, daughter of Alien protagonist Ellen Ripley, as she investigates the disappearance of her mother aboard the space station Sevastopol. Once inside, Amanda discovers that the station has fallen into disarray due to an Alien creature on the loose and must find a way to escape. The game emphasizes stealth and survival horror gameplay, requiring the player to avoid, outsmart, and fight enemies with tools such as a motion tracker and flamethrower.

Alien: Isolation was designed to resemble the original Alien film rather than its more action-oriented 1986 sequel Aliens, and features a similar lo-fi, 1970s vision of what the future could look like. It runs on an engine built to accommodate the Alien's behaviour and technical aspects such as atmospheric and lighting effects. Creative Assembly intended to make Alien: Isolation a third-person game, but used first-person to create a more intense experience. Several downloadable content packs were released, some of which relive scenes from the original film.

Alien: Isolation received positive reviews and sold over two million copies by May 2015. Its retro-futuristic art direction, sound design, and artificial intelligence were praised, while its characters and length received some criticism. It appeared in multiple "best of" lists and won several year-end awards, including Best Audio at the 2015 Game Developers Choice Awards and Audio Achievement at the 11th British Academy Games Awards. It saw ports to Linux and OS X in 2015, Nintendo Switch in 2019, then to Android and iOS mobile devices in 2021. It was also added to the Amazon Luna service in 2021.

Gameplay

Alien: Isolation is a single-player action-adventure game with an emphasis on stealth and survival horror. The player controls Amanda Ripley from a first-person perspective, and must explore a space station and complete objectives while avoiding, outsmarting, and defeating enemies. Objectives range from activating computers to collecting certain items or reaching a specific area. The player can run, climb ladders, sneak into vents, crouch behind objects to break the line of sight with enemies, and peek over or lean around for a safe view. The player also has the ability to go under tables or inside empty lockers to hide from enemies.

Amanda encounters various enemies throughout the station, including hostile human survivors and androids. The player can either eliminate them or avoid them using stealth or distractions. The main antagonist, an Alien creature, pursues the player throughout. The Alien creature cannot be defeated, requiring the player to use stealth tactics in order to survive. Instead of following a predetermined path, the Alien has the ability to actively investigate disturbances and hunt the player by sight or sound. Along the way, the player can use both a flashlight and a motion tracker to detect the Alien's movements. However, using any of these increases the chance of the Alien finding the player. For example, if the Alien is close enough, it will be attracted by the tracker's sound, forcing the player to use the tracker wisely and remove it as soon as it detects motion. The motion tracker cannot detect enemies when they are not moving and cannot determine if the alien creature is up in the ducts or on ground level.

Although Amanda gains access to a revolver, a shotgun, a bolt gun, a flamethrower, and a stun baton over the course of the game, Alien: Isolation emphasizes evasion over direct combat by providing limited ammunition. The player can also craft useful items by collecting schematics and different materials. Items include EMP detonators, noisemakers, molotov cocktails, and pipe bombs; these can help the player deal with enemies. For example, the noisemaker can be used to attract enemies in a particular direction. The Alien is afraid of fire, so using flame weapons forces it to retreat into the station's ventilation system. The player has a limited amount of health which decreases when attacked by enemies; health is restored with medkits, which can be crafted with materials in Amanda's inventory.

The space station is divided into sections connected by trams and elevators. Some doors require certain actions before entry is allowed; for example, some require a keycard or entry codes, while others need to be hacked or cut open with welding torches. Computer terminals and rewiring stations can be used to access information and trigger actions such as disabling security cameras or manipulating the space station's air-purification mechanism. An automap helps the player navigate the different areas. To save game progress, the player needs to locate a terminal and insert Amanda's access card. If Amanda dies, the player will have to restart from the last saved point. In addition to the campaign mode, Alien: Isolation features a special mode, called Survivor Mode, in which the player must complete objectives within a time limit on different challenge maps while being hunted by the Alien.

Plot
In 2137, 15 years after the events of the original Alien film, Amanda Ripley, daughter of Ellen Ripley, learns that the flight recorder of her mother's ship, the Nostromo, has been located. The flight recorder was retrieved by the salvage ship Anesidora, and is being held aboard Sevastopol, a Seegson Corporation space station orbiting gas giant KG-348 in the Zeta Reticuli star system. Christopher Samuels, a Weyland-Yutani android, offers Ripley a place on the retrieval team so that she can have closure regarding the fate of her missing mother. 

Ripley, Samuels, and Weyland-Yutani executive Nina Taylor travel to Sevastopol via the Torrens, a courier ship, only to find the station damaged and external communications offline. While attempting to spacewalk into Sevastopol, their EVA line is severed by debris, and Ripley is separated from the others and forced to enter the station on her own. While exploring the station, Ripley finds the flight recorder of the Nostromo, but the data has been corrupted, and also discovers that the station is out of control due to a deadly Alien creature lurking aboard. After regrouping with Samuels and Taylor, Ripley meets the station's Marshal Waits and his deputy Ricardo. Waits explains that the alien was brought onto the station by Anesidora captain Henry Marlow, who, after recovering the Nostromo flight recorder while salvaging its remains in space,  was able to backtrack the Nostromo's path to LV-426 and locate the derelict alien starship, containing within a nest of alien eggs. While inside, Marlow's wife was attacked by a Facehugger and brought aboard Sevastopol for emergency medical treatment, but died after a Chestburster hatched from her. Waits convinces Ripley to contain the Alien inside a remote module of the station, and then eject it into space. Although Ripley is successful, Waits ejects the module with her still inside. Careening into KG-348, Ripley space-jumps back to Sevastopol using a space suit.

Ripley makes her way back to confront Waits, but Ricardo reveals that the station's service androids have abruptly started slaughtering the remaining crew, including Waits. Samuels attempts to interface with the station's artificial intelligence, APOLLO, to cease the rampage. However, the systems' defensive countermeasures kill him shortly after he opens a path for Ripley into APOLLO's control core. There, Ripley discovers that Seegson had been trying to sell off Sevastopol to Weyland-Yutani, who instructed APOLLO to protect the Alien at all costs. Ripley tells APOLLO that the creature is no longer aboard the station and demands it cease all activity, but the system refuses, stating that "scheduled reactor scans are unverified". At the reactor, Ripley discovers a nest with hundreds of Aliens, and initiates a reactor purge to destroy it. 

Later, Ripley learns that Taylor was secretly sent to retrieve the Alien from Sevastopol, and that she freed Marlow in exchange for the location of LV-426. However, Marlow double-crosses and takes her hostage aboard the Anesidora. There, Ripley finally discovers the Nostromos flight recorder, containing a personal message to her from her mother, thus giving her closure. Meanwhile, Marlow attempts to overload the fusion reactor of the Anesidora to destroy Sevastopol and ensure that no creatures survive; Taylor kills him in an attempt to stop this, but she herself is killed by an electric discharge, forcing Ripley to escape shortly before the Anesidora explodes. The explosion destroys Sevastopol's orbital stabilizers, causing the station to slowly drift into KG-348's atmosphere. Ripley and Ricardo contact the Torrens for extraction, but a Facehugger latches on to Ricardo, forcing Ripley to leave him. After making her way outside to help the Torrens detach from the station, Ripley is surrounded by Alien creatures and ultimately thrown into the ship by a blast. Aboard the Torrens, Ripley discovers that another Alien has boarded the ship. When she is cornered in the airlock, she ejects herself and the Alien into space. Adrift in her space suit, Ripley is awakened by a searchlight.

Development

Alien: Isolation was developed by Creative Assembly, which is best known for their work on the Total War strategy video game series. A game based on the Alien series from 20th Century Fox was conceived when Creative Assembly finished Viking: Battle for Asgard in 2008, after the publisher, Sega, acquired the rights to develop Alien games in December 2006. A six-person team developed the first prototype to pitch the idea, wherein one player would control the alien manually while another would conceal themselves in an environment and try to hide from the creature. The game captured the attention of Sega and the project was eventually approved. Because Creative Assembly had no experience with survival horror games, the company hired people from studios such as Bizarre Creations, Black Rock, Crytek, Ubisoft, and Realtime Worlds for the project. According to director Alistair Hope, the development team grew from "a couple of guys crammed in with the Total War team" to a group of 100 people by 2014.

Creative Assembly decided to design the game more in line with Ridley Scott's 1979 film Alien as opposed to James Cameron's more action-oriented 1986 sequel Aliens. To help the designers authentically recreate the atmosphere of the film, Fox provided them with three terabytes of original production material, including costume photography, concept art, set design, behind the scenes photos, videos, and the film's original sound effect recordings. Artist John Mckellan recalled, "It was a proper gold mine. We saw angles of things we'd never seen before." During the first stage of development, the developers deconstructed the film to find out what made its setting unique. This would allow them to build new environments that were faithful to it. Similarly, the film's original soundtrack was deconstructed so that composers could identify the main cues, which would then be used as templates to extend the soundtrack and fill in the length of the game. The developers also met Alien and Blade Runner editor Terry Rawlings, who would give them additional insight.

Rather than go for a shiny, high-tech science fiction look, the designers opted to recreate the setting and feel of the original Alien film using the work of concept artists Ron Cobb and Mœbius. As a result, the game features a lo-fi, 1970s vision of what the future would look like. For example, it features clunky machinery like phone receivers, monochrome displays, and distorted CRT monitors. To create period authentic distortion on in-game monitors, the developers recorded their in game animations onto VHS and Betamax video recorders, then filmed those sequences playing on an "old curvy portable TV" while adjusting the tracking settings. As digital hacking had not been conceived in the 1970s, the hacking device was built the way it would have been built on the set of the film, and requires players to tune into a computer's signal while selecting icons on its screen. Artist Jon McKellan noted, "We had this rule: If a prop couldn't have been made in '79 with the things that they had around, then we wouldn't make it either."

Creative Assembly wanted Alien: Isolation to have a story that was closely related to the film. As a result, the team decided to explore a story set 15 years after the events of the film which would involve Ellen Ripley's daughter and the Nostromos flight recorder. Writer Will Porter explained that the process of creating a backstory for Amanda was "refreshing" as he felt that she was an overlooked character of the Alien universe. Actress Sigourney Weaver agreed to reprise her role as Ellen Ripley to voice small sections because she felt that the story was interesting and true to the film. Along with Weaver, the original Alien cast, which includes Tom Skerritt, Veronica Cartwright, Harry Dean Stanton, and Yaphet Kotto, reprised their roles for the separate downloadable content missions, marking the first time they were brought back together since the release of the film. All the characters were created with 3D face scans. A major story rewrite happened around a year before release and leftovers from it were discovered in a console build.

Alien: Isolation runs on a proprietary engine that was built from scratch by Creative Assembly. Previously used in Battle for Asgard, the engine was adapted to accommodate technical aspects such as the atmospheric and lighting effects and the alien's behavioural design. The engine's deferred rendering allowed artists to place "hundreds" of dynamic lights in a scene and achieve great geometric detail. A major toolchain update occurred six months into development. Although the new tools eventually improved workflow, they initially caused major disruptions because previous work had to be discarded or ported into the new tools, taking valuable development time away from the team. The alien was designed to look similar to H. R. Giger's original design, including the skull underneath its semitransparent head. However, the designers did alter its humanoid legs with recurved ones to provide the alien a walk cycle that would hold up to scrutiny during longer encounters with the player. Between 70 and 80 different sets of animation for the alien were created. The alien's artificial intelligence was programmed with a complex set of behavioural designs that slowly unlock as it encounters the player, creating the illusion that the alien learns from each interaction and appropriately adjusts its hunting strategy. As gameplay designer Gary Napper explains, "We needed something that would be different every time you played it. You're going to die a lot, which means restarting a lot, and if the alien was scripted, you'd see the same behaviour. That makes the alien become predictable, and a lot less scary." The save system was inspired by a scene in the film where Captain Dallas uses a key-card to access Nostromos computer, Mother.

The developers originally planned to add a feature that would allow players to craft weapons, but the idea was ultimately discarded. According to Hope, "We thought about what people would want to do in order to survive. We explored different ideas, and one of them was fashioning weapons to defend yourself. That was quite early on, but then we realised that this game isn't really about pulling the trigger." Another cancelled feature was the alien's iconic acid blood as a game mechanic, which could melt through metal like in the film. Although the feature was reportedly implemented at one point, it was removed because the developers felt it would take the game in a "weird" direction. Although the game is played from a first-person perspective, it was developed for a considerable amount of time in third-person view. The perspective was changed after the team realised that first person changed the gameplay experience significantly. Hope explained that, in third-person view, Alien: Isolation would have become "a game about jockeying the camera and looking after your avatar. But in first-person it's you that's being hunted. If you're hiding behind an object and you want to get a better view of your surroundings, you have to move." Development took four years after Creative Assembly pitched the idea to Sega. Alien: Isolation was released to manufacturing on 9 September 2014. It is dedicated to Simon Franco, a programmer who died during development.

Marketing and release
Alien: Isolation was first unveiled on 12 May 2011 when UK government minister Ed Vaizey visited Creative Assembly and revealed on his Twitter account that the studio was hiring for an Alien game. Although no gameplay details were confirmed, Sega confirmed that Isolation would be released for consoles. Sega boss Mike Hayes said it was "very much a triple-A project. We want this to be a peer to the likes of Dead Space 2." Although the game's name was anticipated following a trademark registration in October 2013 and some screenshots leaked in December 2013, Alien: Isolation was announced and confirmed for PlayStation 3, PlayStation 4, Windows, Xbox 360, and Xbox One with the release of a teaser trailer on 7 January 2014. The fact that Sega's previous Alien game, Aliens: Colonial Marines, received a negative public reaction did not affect Creative Assembly. According to Napper, the vocal reaction from the Alien fanbase assured the team that they were building a game the fanbase wanted.

Alien: Isolation was presented at E3 2014, where journalists had a chance to play the game. Polygon described the demo as effective and terrifying. The game was also playable on the Oculus Rift virtual reality (VR) headset that was shown at the show. It was awarded Best VR Game and was nominated for Game of the Show, Best Xbox One Game, Best PlayStation 4 Game, Best PC Game, and Best Action Game at the IGNs Best of E3 2014 Awards. At the 2014 Game Critics Awards, it was nominated for Best of Show, Best Console Game, and Best Action/Adventure Game. In August 2014, a cinematic trailer was shown at Gamescom. Alien: Isolation was released on 7 October 2014. According to Sega, it had sold more than one million copies worldwide as of January 2015. As of March 2015, Alien: Isolation had sold over 2.1 million copies in Europe and the US. It was ported by Feral Interactive to Linux and OS X in late 2015, to Nintendo Switch on 5 December 2019, and to Android and iOS devices on 16 December 2021, and was added to the Amazon Luna service on 14 October 2021.

Downloadable content
Alien: Isolation supports additional in-game content in the form of downloadable content packs. The first two packs, Crew Expendable and Last Survivor, were made available at the time of release. Crew Expendable, included in the "Nostromo Edition", relives a scene from Alien and involves the player controlling Ripley, Dallas or Parker attempting to flush an alien creature from the Nostromos air vents into the ship's airlock. Last Survivor, which was originally made available to players who pre-ordered at certain retailers, is set during the film's finale and involves the player controlling Ripley as she tries to activate the Nostromos self-destruct sequence and reach the escape shuttle.

Between October 2014 and March 2015, five additional downloadable content packs were released, expanding the Survivor Mode with new features. A season pass to these five Survivor Mode packs could be purchased before they were released. The first pack, Corporate Lockdown, was released on 28 October 2014 and includes three new challenge maps where the player must complete certain objectives. The second pack, Trauma, was released on 2 December 2014 and includes a new character for use in three additional challenge maps. The third pack, Safe Haven, was released on 13 January 2015 and introduces a new character and a new gameplay mode where the player must complete a series of missions under a time limit. The fourth pack, Lost Contact, which was released on 10 February 2015, is similar to Safe Haven, but offers a different playable character and setting. The last pack, The Trigger, was released on 3 March 2015 and includes three additional challenge maps and a new playable character. A collection featuring the base game and all the downloadable content packs was released for Linux, OS X, PlayStation 4 and Xbox One in late 2015.

Reception

Critical reception for Alien: Isolation was "generally favourable", according to review aggregator Metacritic. Josh Harmon of Electronic Gaming Monthly felt that Alien: Isolation "succeeds as a genuine effort to capture the spirit of the film franchise in playable form, rather than a lazy attempt to use it as an easy backdrop for a cash-in with an ill-fitting genre." Writing for GameSpot, Kevin VanOrd praised the tense and frightening gameplay, stating that "when all mechanics are working as intended, alien-evasion is dread distilled into its purest, simplest form." However, he criticised the "trial and error" progression and frustrating distances between save points. Jeff Marchiafava of Game Informer stated similar pros, but criticised the story and poor acting from the voice actors.

The visuals and atmosphere were praised. Polygon editor Arthur Gies felt that Alien: Isolation is "a beautiful game, full of deep shadows and mystery around every corner," while Dan Whitehead of Eurogamer praised the lighting and unusually compelling environment design. IGNs Ryan McCaffrey gave high marks to the retro-futuristic art direction and sound design, writing: "From wisps of smoke that billow out of air vents to clouds of white mist that obscure your vision when you rewire an area's life-support systems in order to aid your stealthy objectives, Isolation certainly looks and sounds like a part of the Alien universe." Similarly, PC Gamer said that the art design sets Alien: Isolation apart from the likes of System Shock or Dead Space and creates a "convincing science-fiction world, with machines and environments that are functional and utilitarian, rather than overtly futuristic."

The characters were criticised; Game Informer stated that "Amanda exhibits little growth or personality, other than concern for her fellow humans and a desire not to die gruesomely," while Blake Peterson of GameRevolution noted that none of the characters are fully developed. According to him, "we never spend enough time with them to build the emotional bond necessary for their inevitable deaths to mean anything." GameTrailers said that most of the computer terminals contain unoriginal logs to describe predictable events, but also remarked that reading reports from different computer terminals "grounds Sevastopol in an appreciable way."

Writing for GamesRadar, David Houghton praised the alien's advanced artificial intelligence, stating that "progress becomes a case of 'if' and 'how', not 'when'. Movement is measured in inches and feet rather than metres, and simply remaining alive becomes more exhilarating than any objective achieved." Peterson praised the gameplay as tense, scary and effective, writing that Alien: Isolation is "a solid, incredibly striking example of the [survival horror] genre that uses its first person perspective to greater personalize the horror". PC Gamer credited the crafting system for creating "a lot of unexpected depth", allowing players to outsmart enemies in multiple ways. The Survivor Mode was praised by Chris Carter of Destructoid, who felt it offered players different feelings and experiences each time they played it.

Although the gameplay was praised by several reviewers, some found Isolation unnecessarily long, repetitive, and unforgiving. In a mixed review, McCaffrey felt that it did not offer many options of survival, requiring players to spend most of their time hiding in lockers "staring at the motion tracker". Polygon criticised the overexposure to the alien creature, turning Alien: Isolation into an irritating experience. As Gies explained, "Every time I thought I heard the monster, every blip on my motion tracker, was a cause for a tightness in my chest at first. By the 300th time I dived under a table or into a locker, I wasn't scared anymore — I was annoyed." Despite the criticism, Alien: Isolation was considered "brave" by IGN due to its difficult gameplay, a feature that is uncommon in games with large development costs.

Accolades
Alien: Isolation received several year-end awards, including PC Gamers Game of the Year 2014, Audio Achievement at the 11th British Academy Games Awards, Best Audio at the 15th Game Developers Choice Awards, and four awards at the 14th National Academy of Video Game Trade Reviewers. It also appeared on several year-end lists of the best games of 2014. It was ranked 1st in The Daily Telegraphs the 25 best video games of 2014, 2nd in Empires the 10 Best Games Of The Year, 2nd in Times Top 10 Video Games of 2014, 4th in The Guardians Top 25 Games of 2014, 3rd in Reader's top 50 games of 2014 by Eurogamer, and in Daily Mirrors the 10 best games of 2014. In 2015, Alien: Isolation was ranked 6th in Kotakus list of the 10 Best Horror Games. In 2018, The A.V. Club ranked Alien: Isolation as the 5th greatest horror game of all time in a list of 35, while GamesRadar+ ranked Alien: Isolation as the 3rd best horror game of all time out of 20.

Legacy
Although Sega said that sales of Isolation were weak, Creative Assembly originally considered the possibility of developing a sequel. Later, it was revealed that most of the Alien: Isolation design team no longer worked at Creative Assembly, and that the company was working on a first-person tactical shooter based on a new IP. In 2016, a pinball video game adaptation, Aliens vs. Pinball, was released for the Zen Pinball 2 and Pinball FX 2 video games developed by Zen Studios. Two comic book sequels, Aliens: Resistance and Aliens: Rescue, and a novelisation by Keith DeCandido, were released in 2019. A spin-off sequel developed by D3 Go, Alien: Blackout, was released for mobile devices on 24 January 2019, while a web television series adaptation, Alien: Isolation – The Digital Series, was released on IGN on 28 February 2019.

References

External links

 
 

2014 video games
Alien (franchise) games
Android (operating system) games
BAFTA winners (video games)
Creative Assembly games
Interquel video games
IOS games
Linux games
MacOS games
Nintendo Switch games
PlayStation 3 games
PlayStation 4 games
Retrofuturistic video games
Science fiction horror video games
2010s horror video games
Science fiction video games
Sega video games
Single-player video games
Stealth video games
Survival video games
Video games developed in the United Kingdom
Video games featuring female protagonists
Video games scored by Jeff van Dyck
Video games set in the 22nd century
Video games with downloadable content
Windows games
Xbox 360 games
Xbox One games
Game Developers Choice Award winners
Feral Interactive games